Rhythm on the Reservation is a 1939 Fleischer Studios animated short film directed by Dave Fleischer and starring Betty Boop.

The short marks the final theatrical appearance of Betty until her 1988 cameo in Who Framed Roger Rabbit.

Synopsis
Betty Boop's Swing Band visits a Native American reservation. The natives borrow all the musical instruments, but not knowing their real purpose, they find odd uses for them. Betty demonstrates the correct use of the kettle drum and teaches the braves the true meaning of 'rhythm.'

References

External links
Rhythm on the Reservation on Youtube
Rhythm on the Reservation at the Big Cartoon Database
 

1939 short films
Betty Boop cartoons
1930s American animated films
American black-and-white films
1939 animated films
Paramount Pictures short films
Fleischer Studios short films
Short films directed by Dave Fleischer
1930s English-language films
American animated short films
Films about Native Americans
American comedy short films